Maquinna Marine Provincial Park and Protected Area is a provincial park in British Columbia, Canada, located northwest of Tofino in the Clayoquot Sound region of the West Coast of Vancouver Island, protecting Ramsay Hot Springs, which is the name-source of the cove, settlement and former post office of Hot Springs Cove.

See also
Clayoquot Sound Biosphere Reserve
Maquinna
Marktosis

References

External links

Provincial parks of British Columbia
Clayoquot Sound region
Hot springs of British Columbia
1955 establishments in British Columbia
Protected areas established in 1955
Marine parks of Canada